"This Girl Is a Woman Now" is a song written by Victor Millrose and Alan Bernstein and was recorded by Gary Puckett & The Union Gap for their 1969 album The New Gary Puckett and the Union Gap Album.

The song reached No. 2 on the US Easy Listening chart and No. 9 on the US Billboard Hot 100 in 1969. It also reached No. 5 on the Cash Box Top 100.  It reached No. 3 in Canada and No. 13 in Australia.

Chart performance

Weekly charts

Year-end charts

Cover versions
In 1970, a version by Nancy Wilson reached No. 32 on Billboard's easy listening singles chart.

Spanish cover version
Nino Bravo released a Spanish cover of the song in 1972 called "La Niña Es Ya Mujer."

References

External links
 

1969 songs
1969 singles
Gary Puckett & The Union Gap songs
Columbia Records singles
Spanish-language songs
Nancy Wilson (jazz singer) songs
Song recordings produced by Dick Glasser